"Ladies Room" is the second episode of the first season of the American television drama series Mad Men. It was written by series creator Matthew Weiner and directed by Alan Taylor. Weiner has stated that the interval between writing the pilot and the second episode lasted seven years. The episode originally aired on the AMC channel in the United States on July 26, 2007.

Plot
Don Draper's past is probed from different directions by different people and the viewer is presented with the mystery of "Who is Don Draper?" At a dinner with Don and Betty Draper and Roger and Mona Sterling, where they all talk about their affluent childhoods, Don remains silent. Roger probes Don about his past but Don deflects him, suggesting he will reveal the mystery in his forthcoming novel. Don says, "I was raised to see it as a sin of pride to go on like that about yourself", to explain to Betty why he deflected Roger's inquiry. Betty, meanwhile, is troubled—her mother has recently died, and since that time, she has periodically experienced her hands going numb. She and Mona commiserate in the ladies' room at the restaurant. At home in bed, Betty also attempts to probe Don about his past, but he casts his past into the category of "politics, religion, and sex...why talk about it?" As Betty drifts off to sleep she turns to Don, fast asleep, and asks herself, "Who's in there?"

The workplace is portrayed as being staffed by men who behave as boys on shore leave and who view the women as toys, an environment in which the women must navigate (the title of the episode references the weeping women found in the ladies room). Roger is portrayed as a cynical and distant alcoholic who has never grown up and misses his nanny. The members of the creative team, which Don leads, discuss a product and the question of "what women want" arises, leaving them puzzled.

Paul Kinsey tries to come across as a hip man-of-the-world with the African-American man at sandwich cart, but the man deflects Kinsey's comment. After Paul gives Peggy Olson the impression that he can be a good friend to her, he then comes on to her. Peggy rejects his advance, prompting him to ask "Do you belong to someone else?" Peggy expresses annoyance at being targeted by the sexually predatorial males in the office. Joan, the office manager, responds by advising Peggy to "enjoy it while it lasts". Bert Cooper, the senior partner of Sterling Cooper, is introduced as an eccentric, tolerant old man.

The Draper's neighbor, Francine, gossips with Betty about their new neighbor, a divorcée named Helen, and Francine suggests that a divorcée may be bad for real estate values. Betty's physicians suggest she try psychoanalysis, an idea that upsets Don. Don asks Roger "what do women want?", but Roger has no satisfactory answer. He asks the same question of his mistress Midge, who responds "not being asked something like that". Draper then comes up with the catch-phrase: "Any excuse to get closer". Meanwhile, in Betty's first session with the psychiatrist, she talks about her relationship with her late mother and her insecurities about the new divorcée neighbor. After Don and Betty arrive home from dinner, he makes a phone-call to Betty's therapist, shutting himself into his study while the therapist consults his notes from Betty's session.

Cultural references
Don and Roger discuss Richard Nixon's campaign in the upcoming election. Paul reveals himself to be a fan of The Twilight Zone and does an impression of Rod Serling. Several characters watch the series People Are Funny.

Reception
The episode received positive critical reviews from television journalists and critics. Alan Sepinwall, writing for New Jersey's The Star-Ledger, praised the episode for expanding the role of female characters, building on the characters established in the pilot, writing "the small details of how these characters are written and played gives [...] real meaning." Andrew Johnston, writing for Slant Magazine was also impressed by the episode, comparing the series favorably to The Sopranos and praising Michael Gladis' acting in particular.

References

External links
"Ladies Room" at AMC

Mad Men (season 1) episodes
2007 American television episodes